Rui Machado defeated Daniel Muñoz-de la Nava in the final 6–3, 7–6(4).

Seeds

Draw bananas

Final four

Top half

Bottom half

References
 Main Draw
 Qualifying Draw

Status Athens Open - Singles
2009 Singles